Keira Knightley wore a green dress in the 2007 romantic war drama film Atonement. The garment was created by costume designer Jacqueline Durran with director Joe Wright, and is worn during the film's climactic scene. The dress, combining period and modern elements, was praised by media publications upon Atonements release, and is regarded among the most iconic in film history.

Background and design
Atonement (2007), a film adaptation of Ian McEwan's novel, centres around the impact of World War II on one woman's life and journey. Costume designer Jacqueline Durran was asked by Wright to make a memorable dress suitable for a pivotal scene within the film. Wright had opined that the final piece should be green and full-skirted with movement at the hem. He also advised Durran that it should highlight the scene's setting of the hottest day of the year". Durran reviewed fashion books from the 1920s and 30s, including the designs of Coco Chanel, picking elements that would suit Knightley's figure. She designed the piece in 2006, in a fine fabric to be "light and unstructured". The silk was bought in white and dyed into a composite green, picked by Wright from Durran's selection of three pigments. Durran modernized certain period trends, including a bare back and shoulders, to reflect more contemporary styling of "unadorned, bold-coloured gowns".

The dress is an emerald-green, lush, low-cut gown with a flapper drop back and thin straps alongside a drape wrapped around the upper-hip, a central slit, and a Grecian, full-skirted silhouette. It features elements of London fashion in the mid-1930s, but had a modern, 2000s focus with its colouring, patterns, and strap combinations.

In Atonement, Knightley portrays Cecilia, a woman of good breeding who falls in love with Robbie, the governess's son, portrayed by James McAvoy. The dress is worn by Cecilia during the climax of the film, and was noted to fit into the character's aristocratic style. Throughout the film, fashion traces the character's journey from "silken-gowned debutante to a sullied-cotton disgraced woman". The dress was noted to fit into Wright's "visual template" under the quickening pace from the side-shot of Cecilia lighting cigarettes in the garden, before her bare skin exposed through the dress captures Robbie's attention, evolving into a love scene in the library. The sequence's shots largely include full-length lighting and framing of the dress, which Durran noted "[sold the piece] to its best advantage". The dress's colouring was consistent with a green motif within the film, found the setting of the manorial house and the English countryside.

Reception and legacy
Following the film's release, the green dress received widespread press attention and acclaim. As a result of her work in the film, Durran was nominated for the Academy Award for Best Costume Design in 2007. That same year, a Sky Cinema/InStyle poll voted the dress as "greatest film costume ever"; a decade after its release, it was "still regarded as one of the all-time greats." Durran stated that the dress's legacy was a "complete surprise" and attributed its significance to a "perfect storm" of Wright's filming, Knightley's performance, and the film's sequencing. Replicas of the dress have sold for substantial amounts of money, with one retailing for over $30,000. Versions of the dress made for filming were later sold for tens of thousands of dollars, with proceeds going to charity. The dress's shade of green was a rarity among popular film costumes. British Vogue listed the ensemble as one of the most unforgettable green dresses in film.

Vogue Paris stated the outfit became a "cult hit" that made an affordable deviation from period fashion. David Canfield of Entertainment Weekly wrote that the "unforgettable" piece had "a mystique around it — fitting for a movie steeped in the summer haze of memory, and shrouded in delectable ambiguity." Writing for The Guardian, Emanuele Lugli described the buzz surrounding the costume as "entirely justified", stating that it "exudes poise, mystery, and menace" and "controls the screen in a way few other outfits have done". Refinery29 dubbed Knightley's look "a gleaming example of eccentric English style that remains cool as a cucumber-sandwich throughout." Moira Macdonald from the Seattle Times labelled the dress "one of the most beautiful movie costumes of recent decades" with "a slippery, almost watery gown that seems to float over its wearer". Stylist framed the dress as an audience highlight, praising its "slinky, bold, and elegant" design.

See also
 List of individual dresses
 Plum Vera Wang dress of Keira Knightley
 Red dress of Julia Roberts
 White dress of Marilyn Monroe
 Pink dress of Marilyn Monroe
 Black dress of Rita Hayworth
 Black Givenchy dress of Audrey Hepburn

References

1930s fashion
2007 in fashion
2007 clothing
Dresses in film
Film memorabilia
Knightley